Nesodexia is a genus of flies tentatively assigned to the family Polleniidae.

Species
Nesodexia corsicana Villeneuve, 1911

References

Polleniidae
Brachycera genera
Diptera of Europe